Chris Karras (June 5, 1924 - January 4, 2014) was an American painter.

Karras was born in Chicago in 1924. He studied at the Art Institute of Chicago and he received his bachelor's and master's degrees from the University of Illinois at Urbana Champaign. He taught at the University of Colorado at Boulder, the Heights School in Washington and privately. He was the Exhibit Specialist at the National Collection of Fine Arts for five years, and then he worked as Visual Information Specialist at the National Gallery of Art. In the latter position, he was responsible for the gallery modifications, including the display installations. He designed installations for the American Institute of Architects, the Smithsonian Natural History building, the National Collection of Fine Arts and the Gallery of Modern Art.

He died January 4, 2014, at the age of 89.

References
Biography

1924 births
2014 deaths
20th-century American painters
American male painters
21st-century American painters
Artists from Chicago
University of Illinois College of Fine and Applied Arts alumni
University of Colorado Boulder faculty
20th-century American male artists